English Americans (historically known as Anglo-Americans) are Americans whose ancestry originates wholly or partly in England.
In the 2020 American Community Survey, 25.21 million self-identified as being of English origin.

The term is distinct from British Americans, which includes not only English Americans but also Scottish, Scotch-Irish (descendents of Ulster Scots from Ulster, Ireland), Welsh, Cornish and Manx Americans from the whole of the United Kingdom.
Demographers regard the reported number of English Americans as a serious undercount, as the index of inconsistency is high and many if not most Americans of English ancestry have a tendency to identify simply as "Americans" or if of mixed European ancestry, identify with a more recent and differentiated ethnic group.

In the 1980 census, 49.6 million Americans claimed English ancestry. 
At 26.34%, this was the largest group amongst the 188 million people who reported at least one ancestry. The population was 226 million which would have made the English ancestry group 22% of the total. Scotch-Irish Americans are for the most part descendants of Lowland Scots and Northern English (specifically County Durham, Cumberland, Northumberland and Yorkshire) settlers who migrated to Ireland during the Plantation of Ulster in the 17th century.

The majority of the Founding Fathers of the United States were of English ancestry. English immigrants in the 19th century, as with other groups, sought economic prosperity. They began migrating in large numbers, without state support, in the 1840s and continued into the 1890s.

Sense of identity

Americans of English heritage are often seen, and identify, as simply "American" due to the many historic cultural ties between England and the U.S. and their influence on the country's population. Relative to ethnic groups of other European origins, this may be due to the early establishment of English settlements; as well as to non-English groups having emigrated in order to establish significant communities.

Since 1776, English Americans have been less likely to proclaim their heritage, unlike Latino Americans, African Americans, Italian Americans, Irish Americans, Native Americans or other ethnic groups. A leading specialist, Charlotte Erickson, found them to be ethnically "invisible," dismissing the occasional St. George Societies as ephemeral elite clubs that were not in touch with a larger ethnic community.  In Canada, by contrast, the English organized far more ethnic activism, as the English competed sharply with the well-organized French and Irish elements.  In the United States the Scottish immigrants were much better organized than the English in the 19th century, as were their descendants in the late 20th century.

Number of English Americans

The original 17th century settlers were overwhelmingly English. From the time of the first permanent English presence in the New World until the 1900s, these migrants and their descendants outnumbered all others firmly establishing the English cultural pattern as predominant for the American version.

Colonial period
According to studies and estimates, the ethnic populations in the British American Colonies of 1700, 1755 and 1775 were:

At the time of the first census in 1790, English was the majority ancestry in all U.S. states, ranging from a high of 96.2% in Connecticut to a low of 58.0% in New Jersey.

Data

National origins: 1790–1900 

The ancestries of the population in 1790 (the first national population census) has been estimated by various sources, first in 1909, then again in 1932, 1980 and 1984 by sampling distinctive surnames in the census and assigning them a country of origin. There is debate over the accuracy between the studies with individual scholars and the Federal Government using different techniques and conclusion for the ethnic composition.
A study published in 1909 titled A Century of Population Growth. From the First to the Twelfth census of the United States: 1790-1900 by the Government Census Bureau estimated the English were 83.5%, 6.7% Scottish, 1.6% Irish, 2.0% Dutch, 0.5% French, 5.6% German and 0.1% all others of the white population for the 12 enumerated states. "Hebrews" (Jews) were less than one-tenth of 1 percent. When the Scotch and Irish are added, British origins would be more than 90% of the European ancestry.
The same 1909 data for each state (of the total European population only) of English ancestry were Connecticut 96.2%, Rhode Island 96.0%, Vermont 95.4%, Massachusetts 95.0%, New Hampshire 94.1%, Maine 93.1%, Virginia  85.0%, Maryland 84.0%, North Carolina 83.1%, South Carolina 82.4%, New York 78.2% and Pennsylvania 59.0%. CPG estimated that, of all European Americans in the Continental United States as of 1790, 82.1% were English, followed by 7.0% Scotch, 5.6% German, 2.5% Dutch, 1.9% Irish, and 0.6% French.

Colonial English American population in 1790 
The 1909 Century of Population Growth report came under intense scrutiny in the 1920s; its methodology was subject to criticism over fundamental flaws that cast doubt on the accuracy of its conclusions. The catalyst for controversy had been passage of the Immigration Act of 1924, which imposed numerical quotas on each country of Europe limiting the number of immigrants to be admitted out of a finite total annual pool. The size of each national quota was determined by the National Origins Formula, in part computed by estimating the origins of the colonial stock population descended from White Americans enumerated in the 1790 Census. The undercount of other colonial stocks like German Americans and Irish Americans would thus have contemporary policy consequences. When CPG was produced in 1909, the concept of independent Ireland did not even exist. CPG made no attempt to further classify its estimated 1.9% Irish population to distinguish Celtic Irish Catholics of Gaelic Ireland, who in 1922 formed the independent Irish Free State, from the Scotch-Irish descendants of Ulster Scots and Anglo-Irish of the Plantation of Ulster, which became Northern Ireland and remained part of the United Kingdom. In 1927, proposed immigration quotas based on CPG figures were rejected by the President's Committee chaired by the Secretaries of State, Commerce, and Labor, with the President reporting to Congress "the statistical and historical information available raises grave doubts as to the whole value of these computations as the basis for the purposes intended."
Among the criticisms of A Century of Population Growth:
 CPG failed to account for Anglicization of names, assuming any surname that could be English was actually English
 CPG failed to consider first names even when obviously foreign, assuming anyone with a surname that could be English was actually English
 CPG started by classifying all names as Scotch, Irish, Dutch, French, German, Hebrew, or other. All remaining names which could not be classed with one of the 6 other listed nationalities, nor identified by the Census clerk as too exotic to be English, were assumed to be English
 CPG classification was an unscientific process by Census clerks with no training in history, genealogy, or linguistics, nor were scholars in those fields consulted
 CPG estimates were produced by a linear process with no checks on potential errors nor opportunity for peer review or scholarly revision once an individual clerk had assigned a name to a nationality

Concluding that CPG "had not been accepted by scholars as better than a first approximation of the truth", the Census Bureau commissioned a study to produce new scientific estimates of the colonial American population, in collaboration with the American Council of Learned Societies, in time to be adopted as basis for legal immigration quotas in 1929, and later published in the journal of the American Historical Association, reproduced in the table below. Note: as in the original CPG report, the "English" category encompassed England and Wales, grouping together all names classified as either "Anglican" (from England) or "Cambrian" (from Wales).

Estimated English American population in the Continental United States as of the 1790 Census.

Another source by Thomas L. Purvis in 1984 estimated that people of English ancestry made up about 47.5% of the total population or 60.9% of the European American or white population (his figures can also be found, and as divided by region, in Colin Bonwick, The American Revolution, 1991 p. 2540-839-1346-2). 
The study which gives similar results can be found in The American Revolution, Colin Bonwick in percentages for 1790: 47.9 English, 3.5 Welsh, 8.5 Scotch Irish (Ulster), 4.3 Scottish, 4.7 Irish (South), 7.2 German, 2.7 Dutch, 1.7 French, 0.2 Swedish, 19.3 Black. The difference between the two estimates are found by comparing the ratios of the groups (adding and subtracting) to accommodate and adding the Welsh. The category 'Irish' in the Bonwick study represents immigrants from Ireland outside the Province of Ulster, the overwhelming majority of whom were Protestant and not ethnically Irish, though from Ireland. They were not Irish Catholics. By the time the American War for Independence started in 1776, Catholics were 1.6%, or 40,000 persons of the 2.5 million population of the 13 colonies. 
Some 80.7% of the total United States population was of European origin.

Using the first model above, in 1900, an estimated 28,375,000 or 37.8% of the population of the United States was wholly or partly of English ancestry from colonial roots. The estimate was based on the Census Bureaus Estimate that approximately thirty five million white Americans were descended from colonial forebears

Census: 1980–2000 
In 1980, 23,748,772 Americans claimed only English ancestry and another 25,849,263 claimed English along with another ethnic ancestry. 13.3 million or 5.9% of the total U.S. population chose to identify as "American" (counted under "not specified") as also seen in censuses that followed. Below shows the persons who reported at least one specific ancestry are as follows.

In 1990, the national level response rate for the question was high with 90.4% of the total United States population choosing at least one specific ancestry and 9.6% ignored the question completely. Of those who chose English, 66.9% of people chose it as their first response.
Totals for the English showed a considerable decrease from the previous census.
Responses for "American" slightly decreased both numerically and as a percentage from 5.9% to 5.2% in 1990 with most being from the South.

In the 2000 census, 24.5 million or 8.7% of Americans reported English ancestry, a decline of some eight million people. At the national level, the response rate for the ancestry question fell to 80.1% of the total U.S. population, while 19.9% were unclassified or ignored the question completely. It was the fourth largest ancestral group. Some Cornish Americans may not identify as English American, even though Cornwall had been part of England since long before their ancestors arrived in North America. Responses were:

2010–2020 totals 
In 2010, the American Community Survey enumerated Americans reporting English ancestry at 27.4 million, 9.0% of the U.S. population; in 2015, 24.8 million, 7.8% of the population. A decade thereafter, in 2020, the U.S. Census Bureau recorded 25.2 million Americans reporting full or partial English ancestry, about 7.7% of the U.S. population. The decline in English identification in the 21st century may merely reflect further cultural assimilation of English Americans into the broader identity of White Americans, increasingly intermixed with other European Americans: the number of Americans who reported being solely of English ancestry alone steadily fell from 9,605,188 in 2010 to 8,992,416 in 2015 to 8,253,942 in 2020. However, the number of Americans who reported being of English ancestry mixed with another ancestry fluctuated from 17,799,055 in 2010 down to 15,794,133 in 2015 up to 16,959,677 in 2020.

Geographical distribution

2000 state totals
English Americans are found in large numbers throughout the United States, particularly in the Northeast, South and West. According to the 2000 U.S. census, the 10 states with the largest populations of self-reported English Americans are:

English was the highest reported European ancestry in the states of Maine, Vermont and Utah; joint highest along with German in the Carolinas.

Cities
The following are the top 20 highest percentages of people of English ancestry, in U.S. communities with 500 or more total inhabitants (for the total list of the 101 communities, see the reference):

On the top right, a map showing percentages by county of Americans who declared English ancestry in the 2000 Census. Dark blue and purple colours indicate a higher percentage: highest in the east and west (see also Maps of American ancestries). Center, a map showing the population of English Americans by state. On the right, a map showing the percentages of English Americans by state.

2020 state totals

History

Early settlement and colonization

English settlement in America began with Jamestown in the Virginia Colony in 1607. With the permission of James I, three ships (the Susan Constant, The Discovery, and The God Speed) sailed from England and landed at Cape Henry in April, under the captainship of Christopher Newport, who had been hired by the London Company to lead expeditions to what is now America.

The second successful colony was Plymouth Colony, founded in 1620 by people who later became known as the Pilgrims. Fleeing religious persecution in the East Midlands in England, they first went to Holland, but feared losing their English identity. Because of this, they chose to relocate to the New World, with their voyage being financed by English investors. In September 1620, 102 passengers set sail aboard the Mayflower, eventually settling at Plymouth Colony in November. Of the passengers on the Mayflower, 41 men signed the "Mayflower Compact" aboard ship on November 11, 1620, while anchored in Provincetown Harbor. Signers included Carver, Alden, Standish, Howland, Bradford, Allerton, and Fuller. This story has become a central theme in the United States cultural identity.

A number of English colonies were established under a system of proprietary governors, who were appointed under mercantile charters to English joint stock companies to found and run settlements.

England also took over the Dutch colony of New Netherland (including the New Amsterdam settlement), renaming it the Province of New York in 1664. With New Netherland, the English came to control the former New Sweden (in what is now Delaware), which the Dutch had conquered from Sweden earlier. This became part of Pennsylvania.

English immigration after 1776
Cultural similarities and a common language allowed English immigrants to integrate rapidly and gave rise to a unique Anglo-American culture. An estimated 3.5 million English immigrated to the U.S. after 1776.  English settlers provided a steady and substantial influx throughout the 19th century. 

A number of English settlers moved to the United States from Australia in the 1850s (then a British political territory), when the California Gold Rush boomed; these included the so-called "Sydney Ducks" (see Australian Americans).

During the last years of the 1860s, annual English immigration grew to over 60,000 and continued to rise to over 75,000 per year in 1872, before experiencing a decline. The final and most sustained wave of immigration began in 1879 and lasted until the depression of 1893. During this period English annual immigration averaged more than 82,000, with peaks in 1882 and 1888 and did not drop significantly until the financial panic of 1893. The building of America's transcontinental railroads, the settlement of the great plains, and industrialization attracted skilled and professional emigrants from England.

Also, cheaper steamship fares enabled unskilled urban workers to come to America, and unskilled and semiskilled laborers, miners, and building trades workers made up the majority of these new English immigrants. While most settled in America, a number of skilled craftsmen remained itinerant, returning to England after a season or two of work. Groups came to practice their religion freely.

The depression of 1893 sharply decreased English emigration to the United States, and it stayed low for much of the twentieth century. This decline reversed itself in the decade of World War II when over 100,000 English (18 percent of all European immigrants) came from England. In this group was a large contingent of war brides who came between 1945 and 1948. In these years four women emigrated from England for every man. In the 1950s, English immigration increased to over 150,000 and rose to 170,000 in the 1960s. While differences developed, it is not surprising that English immigrants had little difficulty in assimilating to American life. The American resentment against the policies of the British government was rarely transferred to English settlers who came to America in the first decades of the nineteenth century.

Throughout American history, English immigrants and their descendants have been prominent in every level of government and in every aspect of American life. Known informally as "WASPS" (see White Anglo-Saxon Protestants), their dominance has slipped since 1945, but remains high in many fields. Eight out of the first ten American presidents and more than that proportion of the 46 presidents, as well as the majority of sitting congressmen and congresswomen, are descended from English ancestors. The descendants of English expatriates are so numerous and so well integrated in American life that it is impossible to identify all of them. While they are the third-largest ethnic nationality self-reported in the 1990 census, they retain such a pervasive representation at every level of national and state government that, on any list of American senators, Supreme Court judges, governors, or legislators, they would constitute a plurality if not an outright majority.

Political influence
As early colonists of the United States, settlers from England and their descendants often held positions of power and made and enforced laws,  often because many had been involved in government back in England. In the original Thirteen Colonies, most laws contained elements found in the English common law system.

The majority of the Founding Fathers of the United States were of English extraction. A minority were of high social status and can be classified as White Anglo-Saxon Protestant (WASP).  Many of the prewar WASP elite were Loyalists who left the new nation.
 
While WASPs have been major players in every major American political party, an exceptionally strong association has existed between WASPs and the Republican Party, before the 1980s.  A few top Democrats qualified, such as Franklin D. Roosevelt. Northeastern Republican leaders such as Leverett Saltonstall of Massachusetts, Prescott Bush of Connecticut and especially Nelson Rockefeller of New York exemplified the pro-business liberal Republicanism of their social stratum, espousing internationalist views on foreign policy, supporting social programs, and holding liberal views on issues like racial integration. A famous confrontation was the 1952 Senate election in Massachusetts where John F. Kennedy, a Catholic of Irish descent, defeated WASP Henry Cabot Lodge, Jr. However the challenge by Barry Goldwater in 1964 to the Eastern Republican establishment helped undermine the WASP dominance. Goldwater himself had solid WASP credentials through his mother, of a prominent old Yankee family, but was instead mistakenly seen as part of the Jewish community (which he had never associated with). By the 1980s, the liberal Rockefeller Republican wing of the party was marginalized, overwhelmed by the dominance of the Southern and Western conservative Republicans.

Asking "Is the WASP leader a dying breed?" journalist Nina Strochlic in 2012 pointed to eleven WASP top politicians—typically scions of upper class English families. She ended with Republicans George H. W. Bush elected in 1988, his son George W. Bush elected in 2000 and 2004, and John McCain, who was nominated but defeated in 2008.

Language

English is the most commonly spoken language in the U.S, where it is estimated that two thirds of all native speakers of English live.
The American English dialect developed from English colonization. It serves as the de facto official language, the language in which government business is carried out. According to the 1990 census, 94% of the U.S. population speak only English. Adding those who speak English "well" or "very well" brings this figure to 96%. Only 0.8% speak no English at all as compared with 3.6% in 1890. American English differs from British English in a number of ways, the most striking being in terms of pronunciation (for example, American English retains the pronunciation of the letter "R" after vowels, unlike standard British English, though it still can be heard in several regional dialects in England) and spelling (one example is the "u" in words such as color, favor (US) vs colour, favour (UK)). Less obvious differences are present in grammar and vocabulary. The differences are rarely a barrier to effective communication between American English and British English speakers, but there are certainly enough differences to cause occasional misunderstandings, usually surrounding slang or dialect differences.

Some states, like California, have amended their constitutions to make English the only official language, but in practice, this only means that official government documents must at least be in English, and does not mean that they should be exclusively available only in English.  For example, the standard California Class C driver's license examination is available in 32 different languages.

Expression
"In for a penny, in for a pound" is an expression to mean, ("if you're going to take a risk at all, you might as well make it a big risk"), is used in the United States which dates back to the colonial period, when cash in the colonies was denominated in Pounds, shillings and Pence.
Today, the one-cent coin is commonly known as a penny. A modern alternative expression is "In for a dime, in for a dollar".

Cultural contributions

Much of American culture shows influences from English culture.

Cuisine

Apple pie - New England was the first region to experience large-scale English colonization in the early 17th century, beginning in 1620, and it was dominated by East Anglian Calvinists, better known as the Puritans. Baking was a particular favorite of the New Englanders and was the origin of dishes seen today as quintessentially "American", such as apple pie and the oven-roasted Thanksgiving turkey. "As American as apple pie" is a well-known phrase used to suggest that something is all-American.
Roast beef - In the middle of the 17th century a second wave of English immigrants began arriving in North America, settling mainly in the Chesapeake Bay region of Virginia and Maryland, expanding upon the Jamestown settlement. Their roast beef was often served with Yorkshire puddings and horseradish sauce.

Celebrations

Thanksgiving was celebrated by English settlers to give thanks to God for helping the Pilgrims of Plymouth Colony survive the brutal winter. This feast lasted three days, as accounted by attendee Edward Winslow.

Law
The American legal system also has its roots in English law. } English law prior to the American Revolution is still part of the law of the United States, and provides the basis for many American legal traditions and policies.
After the revolution, English law was again adopted by the now independent American States.

Education
The first American schools in the thirteen original colonies opened in the 17th century. Boston Latin School was founded in 1635 and is both the first public school and oldest existing school in the United States. The first free taxpayer-supported public school in North America, the Mather School, was opened in Dorchester, Massachusetts, in 1639.

New England had a long emphasis on literacy in order that individuals could read the Bible. Harvard College was founded by the colonial legislature in 1636, and named after an early benefactor. Most of the funding came from the colony, but the college began to build an endowment from its early years. Harvard at first focused on training young men for the ministry, but many alumni went into law, medicine, government or business. The college was a leader in bringing Newtonian science to the colonies.

A school of higher education for both Native American young men and the sons of the colonists was one of the earliest goals of the leaders of the Colony of Virginia. The College of William & Mary was founded  founded on February 8, 1693, under a royal charter (legally, letters patent) to "make, found and establish a certain Place of Universal Study, a perpetual College of Divinity, Philosophy, Languages, and other good arts and sciences...to be supported and maintained, in all time coming." Named in honor of the reigning monarchs King William III and Queen Mary II, the college is the second oldest college in the United States. It hired the first law professor and trained many of the lawyers, politicians, and leading planters. Students headed for the ministry were given free tuition.

Yale College was founded by Puritans in 1701, and in 1716 was relocated to New Haven, Connecticut. The conservative Puritan ministers of Connecticut had grown dissatisfied with the more liberal theology of Harvard, and wanted their own school to train orthodox ministers. However president Thomas Clap (1740–1766) strengthened the curriculum in the natural sciences and made Yale a stronghold of revivalist New Light theology.

The Colonial Colleges are nine institutions of higher education chartered in the Thirteen Colonies before the United States of America became a sovereign nation after the American Revolution. These nine have long been considered together, notably since the survey of their origins in the 1907 The Cambridge History of English and American Literature. Seven of the nine colonial colleges became seven of the eight Ivy League universities: Harvard, Columbia, Princeton, Yale, University of Pennsylvania, Dartmouth, and Brown.

Music
National anthem - The Star-Spangled Banner takes its melody from the 18th-century English song "To Anacreon in Heaven" written by John Stafford Smith for the Anacreontic Society, a men's social club in London. The lyrics were written by Francis Scott Key of English descent. This became a well-known and recognized patriotic song throughout the United States, which was officially designated as the U.S. national anthem in 1931. 
Hail to the Chief - is the song to announce the arrival or presence of the President of the United States. English songwriter James Sanderson (c. 1769 – c. 1841), composed the music and was first performed in 1812 in New York.

Before 1931, other songs served as the hymns of American officialdom.

The Liberty Song - written by John Dickinson of English descent in 1768 to the music of Englishman William Boyce's "Heart of Oak", is perhaps the first patriotic song written in America. The song contains the line "by uniting we stand, by dividing we fall", the first recorded use of the sentiment.
America (My Country, 'Tis of Thee) - whose melody was indirectly derived from the British national anthem, also served as a de facto anthem before the adoption of "The Star-Spangled Banner."

Amazing Grace - written by English poet and clergyman John Newton became such an icon in American culture that it has been used for a variety of secular purposes and marketing campaigns, placing it in danger of becoming a cliché.
Yankee Doodle - is written and accredited to Englishman Richard Shuckburgh an army doctor. The tune comes from the English nursery rhyme Lucy Locket.

English ballads, jigs, and hornpipes had a large influence on American folk music, eventually contributing to the formation of such genres as old time, country, bluegrass, and to a lesser extent, blues as well.

Sports

Baseball was invented in England. English lawyer William Bray recorded a game of baseball on Easter Monday 1755 in Guildford, Surrey; Bray's diary was verified as authentic in September 2008. This early form of the game was apparently brought to North America by British immigrants. The first appearance of the term that exists in print was in "A Little Pretty Pocket-Book" in 1744, where it is called Base-Ball.
American football traces its roots to early versions of rugby football, played in England and first developed in American universities in the mid-19th century.

English family names
In 2010, the top ten family names in the United States, seven have English origins or having possible mixed British Isles heritage, the other three being of Spanish origin.
Many African Americans have their origins in slavery (i.e. slave name) and ancestrally came to bear the surnames of their former owners. Many freed slaves either created family names themselves or adopted the name of their former master. Due to anti-German xenophobia during the first and second world wars, some German families anglicized their names. For example changing "Schmidt" to "Smith," causing an increase of English names.

English place names in the United States

This is a partial list of places in the United States named after places in England as a result of the many English settlers and explorers; in addition, some places were named after the English royal family. These include the region of New England and some of the following:

Alabama
Birmingham after Birmingham, England
Brighton after Brighton, England

California
Westminster after Westminster in London, England
Exeter after Exeter, England
Windsor after Windsor, Berkshire, in England

Connecticut
Avon after Avon, England
Colchester after Colchester, England
Cornwall after Cornwall, England
Danbury after Danbury, Essex, England
Greenwich after Greenwich, England
Guilford after Guildford, England
Kent after Kent, England
Litchfield after Lichfield, England
New London after London, England
Norwich after Norwich, England
Stamford after Stamford, Lincolnshire, England
Windsor after Windsor, Berkshire, in England

Delaware
Dover after Dover, England
Wilmington named by Proprietor Thomas Penn after his friend Spencer Compton, Earl of Wilmington, who was prime minister in the reign of George II of Great Britain.

Georgia
Georgia was named after King George II.

Maryland
Maryland named so for Queen Henrietta Maria (Queen Mary).

Massachusetts
Boston after Boston, England 
Braintree after Braintree, England
Gloucester after Gloucester, England
Northampton after Northampton, England
Southampton after Southampton, England
Springfield after Springfield, Essex, England

New Hampshire
New Hampshire state (after Hampshire)
Manchester after Manchester, England

New Jersey
Burlington County and Burlington after the English east-coast town of Bridlington.
Camden named by local Jacob Cooper after Charles Pratt, 1st Earl Camden.
Gloucester County and Gloucester City after the city of Gloucester / county of Gloucestershire in England.
Newark after the town of Newark-on-Trent, England

New York
Cornwall (originally "New Cornwall") after the county of Cornwall in southwest England
 Liverpool Village after Liverpool England.
New York City (after the Duke of York)
New York (State) (also after the Duke of York)
Suffolk County after Suffolk, England

Pennsylvania

 Bedford and Bedford County after Bedford, England
Berks County after Berkshire (pronounced "Barkshire"), England
Bristol and Bristol Township after Bristol, England
Bucks County after Buckinghamshire, England
Chester County and Chester after Chester, England
Darby derived from Derby (pronounced "Darby"), the county town of Derbyshire (pronounced "Darbyshire")
Horsham after Horsham (pronounced "Hor-sham"), England
Lancaster County and Lancaster after the city of Lancaster in the county of Lancashire in England, the native home of John Wright, one of the early settlers.
New Castle after Newcastle upon Tyne, England
Northampton County after Northamptonshire, England
Reading, Berks County after Reading (pronounced "Redding"), Berkshire (pronounced "Barkshire"), England
Trafford after Trafford Borough in Greater Manchester, England
Warminster after the small town of Warminster in the county of Wiltshire, at the western extremity of Salisbury Plain, England.
Warrington after Warrington, England
Warwick after Warwick, England

The Carolinas
The province, named Carolina (The Carolinas-North and South) to honor King Charles I of England, was divided into SC and NC in 1729, although the actual date is the subject of debate.
Raleigh after Sir Walter Raleigh, one of the first English explorers of the Carolinas.

Virginia
The name Virginia was first applied by Queen Elizabeth I (the "Virgin Queen") and Sir Walter Raleigh in 1584.
Norfolk after the county of Norfolk, England
Portsmouth after Portsmouth, England
Richmond named by William Byrd II after Richmond, London where he spent part of his childhood.
Suffolk after the county of Suffolk, England

Notable people

Presidents of English descent

Most of the presidents of the United States have had English ancestry. The extent of English heritage varies. Earlier presidents were predominantly of colonial English Yankee origin. Later presidents' ancestry can often be traced to ancestors from multiple nations in Europe, including England. The presidents who have lacked recent English ancestry are Martin Van Buren, James K. Polk, James Buchanan, Woodrow Wilson, John F. Kennedy, and Donald Trump.

18th century
George Washington, John Adams.

19th century
Thomas Jefferson, James Madison John Quincy Adams, Andrew Jackson, William Henry Harrison, John Tyler, Zachary Taylor, Millard Fillmore, Franklin Pierce, Abraham Lincoln, Andrew Johnson, Ulysses S. Grant, Rutherford B. Hayes, James A. Garfield, Chester A. Arthur, Grover Cleveland, Benjamin Harrison, William McKinley.

20th century
Theodore Roosevelt, William Howard Taft, Warren G. Harding, Calvin Coolidge, Herbert Hoover, Franklin D. Roosevelt, Harry S. Truman, Lyndon B. Johnson, Richard Nixon, Gerald Ford, Jimmy Carter, Ronald Reagan, George H. W. Bush, Bill Clinton.

21st century
George W. Bush, Barack Obama, Joe Biden.

See also
American ethnicity
Americans or American people
Anglo America
Anglo-Celtic Australian
Boston Brahmin
British American
Demographic history of the United States
English (ethnic group)
English diaspora
Immigration to the United States
Maps of American ancestries
Old Stock Americans
Scotch-Irish American
Scottish American
Anglo-American relations
Welsh American
White Anglo-Saxon Protestants
White Southerners
Yankee
English Canadians
English Australians
White Americans
European Americans
Non-Hispanic whites

References

Further reading
 Berthoff, Rowland. British Immigrants in Industrial America, 1790-1950 (1953). online
 Bridenbaugh, Carl. Vexed and Troubled Englishmen, 1590-1642 (1976). online
 Erickson, Charlotte. Invisible Immigrants: The Adaptation of English and Scottish Immigrants in Nineteenth-Century America (1972).
 Furer, Howard B., ed. The British in America: 1578-1970 (1972). online; chronology and documents
 Hanft, Sheldon. "English Americans." in Gale Encyclopedia of Multicultural America, edited by Thomas Riggs, (3rd ed., vol. 2, Gale, 2014), pp. 73–86. Online
 Richards, Eric. Britannia's children: emigration from England, Scotland, Wales and Ireland since 1600 (A&C Black, 2004) online.

 Shepperson, Wilbur S. British emigration to North America; projects and opinions in the early Victorian period (1957) online
 Tennenhouse, Leonard. The Importance of Feeling English: American Literature and the British Diaspora, 1750-1850 (2007). online
 Van Vugt, William E. "British (English, Scottish, Scots Irish, and Welsh) and British Americans, 1870–1940’." in Elliott Barkan, ed., Immigrants in American History: Arrival, Adaptation, and Integration (2013): 4:237+.
 Van Vugt, William E. British Buckeyes: The English, Scots, and Welsh in Ohio, 1700-1900 (2006).
 Van Vugt, William E. Britain to America: mid-nineteenth-century immigrants to the United States (University of Illinois Press, 1999).

 
 
 
European-American society